Norman Hall Tunnel (also known as the 13th Street Underpass or 13th Street Tunnel) is a multi-use path tunnel on the campus of the University of Florida in Gainesville, Florida. The tunnel connects the east and west side of 13th Street (U.S. Route 441), connecting Norman Hall and the main campus of the university. The tunnel is a well known site for graffiti art and photographers.

The tunnel has been opened to the public since at least 1957.

Since at least 2014, the Norman Tunnel has been criticized for its dated design (only worsened by alleged lackluster maintenance), resulting in collisions between pedestrians and cyclists going through the tunnel.

It is one of two pedestrian/cycling crossing not at-grade with 13th Street. The other being the Helyx Bridge about a quarter mile to the south.

References 

Buildings at the University of Florida
Tunnels in Florida
1957 introductions